Aenigma is a genus of ground beetles in the family Carabidae. This genus has a single species, Aenigma iris, found in eastern Australia.

References

Anthiinae (beetle)
Beetles described in 1836